Archduke Leopold Wilhelm and the artist in the archducal picture gallery in Brussels is a 1651 painting of Archduke Leopold Wilhelm's Italian art collection by the Flemish Baroque painter David Teniers the Younger, now held in the Kunsthistorisches Museum in Vienna.

Description 
The painting shows the Archduke as a collector with friends admiring a set of paintings. The artist himself holds his hat in his hand and is listening to his patron as the archduke gestures with his cane towards some recent acquisitions. The paintings are arranged in rows on a rear wall, with several others on the side of the vestibule on the left, and a set that are positioned in the foreground leaning against chairs for inspection.

History 
This painting is a copy by the artist and one of the first that David Teniers the Younger prepared to document the Archduke's collection before he employed 12 engravers to publish his Theatrum Pictorium, considered the "first illustrated art catalog". He published this book of engravings after the Archduke had moved to Austria and taken his collection with him. It was published in Antwerp in 1659 and again in 1673. The original version of this painting, with the figures arranged differently, is in the collection of Petworth House, south of London.

Paintings depicted

Most of the recognizable paintings in the collection, not all of which were included in the Italian catalog prepared by Teniers, are still in the Viennese collection. The full list of the depicted paintings is the same as the Petworth version. That version, which includes a portrait of Bishop Antonius Triest (1576-1657), served as the basis for this copy, though they are about the same size and were possibly both made at the same time in tandem. The bishop was an art collector and a patron of many of Teniers's contemporary artists in Antwerp, and introduced Teniers to the Archduke. This copy remained in the archducal collection, while several others were documented as gifts. The most impressive of these was the large version on copper in the Museo del Prado with a different selection of paintings.

References 

 History of the Collection on museum website
 David Teniers and the Theatre of Painting, exhibition 19 October 2006 to 21 January 2007 on website of the Courtauld Institute of Art

1651 paintings
Paintings in Vienna
Paintings in the collection of the Archduke Leopold Wilhelm of Austria
Paintings of art galleries
Paintings by David Teniers the Younger
Dogs in art